Promanus is a genus of beetles of the family Lophocateridae, endemic to New Zealand.

References

Beetles of New Zealand
Cleroidea genera